Peat-Bog Soldiers is a 1938 Soviet drama film directed by Aleksandr Macheret and written by Yury Olesha.

Plot 
The National Socialists send a German underground worker to a concentration camp. With the help of his friends, he decides to flee from there.

Starring 
 Oleg Zhakov as Paul
 S. Shirokova as Marie
 Ivan Kudryavtsev as Tiedemann
 Aleksandr Zrazhevsky as Bischoff
 Vasili Vanin as The Camp Commander
 S. Muratov as Oswald
 Boris Pyasetsky as Belz
 Aleksey Konsovsky as Franz Müller
 Igor Doronin as Robert
 Alexey Gribov as Schultz
 Ivan Koval-Samborsky as Walter
 Andrei Fajt as Garms

References

External links 

1938 films
1930s Russian-language films
Soviet drama films
Soviet black-and-white films
1938 drama films